"Hometown" is a song by Australian indie pop band, Sheppard. The song was released in Australia on 1 June 2018 as the sixth single from the band's second studio album, Watching the Sky (2018).

Upon release, George Sheppard said "With "Coming Home" and now "Hometown", it's pretty clear we've been on the road a lot these last few years. The two are almost companion pieces, with "Coming Home" about how much we love Australia and "Hometown" a love song about how no matter where in the world you are, if you're with the one you love then you are home."

Critical reception
Melvin Peters from Nieuweplaat said it "sounds like a soundtrack to a new film".

Track listing
Digital download
"Hometown" – 3:07

Charts

Release history

References

2018 singles
2018 songs
Sheppard (band) songs
Songs written by Leroy Clampitt